5 kilometr is a rural locality (a settlement) in Krasnosludskoye Rural Settlement of Dobryansky District, Perm Krai, Russia. The population was 328 as of 2010.

Geography 
The settlement is located on the shore of the Chusov Bay of Kama Reservoir.

Streets 
 2nd Rechnaya
 Bolnichnyy gorodok
 Dachnaya
 Dorozhnaya
 Zarechnaya
 Lugovaya
 Naberezhnaya
 Nagornaya
 Pesochnaya
 Pribrezhnaya
 Pribrezhnyy snt
 Rechnaya
 Solnechnaya
 Tsentralnaya

References 

Rural localities in Dobryansky District